Deli River (Indonesian: Sungai Deli) is a river located in Sumatra, Indonesia, and courses through Medan before discharging to the Strait of Malacca near the port city of Belawan. It is one of the eight rivers in Medan. The Deli Sultanate was founded on the delta of the river around 1640, and later around the 19th century, this river acted as an artery of trade for the sultanate to other areas.

Hydrology 
The forest area in the headwaters of the Deli is 3,655 hectares, or 7.59 percent of 48 162 hectares of Deli watershed. With an area of 48 162 hectares, length of 73 kilometers (km), and a width of 5.58 m, Deli watershed should have at least 140 hectares, or 30 percent of the watershed.

Today, the river is heavily polluted. 70 percent of waste in the Deli River are solid or liquid waste, due to waste generated in the densely populated city of Medan (reaching 1,725 tons a day).

Geography
The river flows in the northeastern area of Sumatra with predominantly tropical rainforest climate (designated as Af in the Köppen-Geiger climate classification). The annual average temperature in the area is 24 °C. The warmest month is January, when the average temperature is around 26 °C, and the coldest is December, at 22 °C. The average annual rainfall is 2862 mm. The wettest month is October, with an average of 446 mm rainfall, and the driest is June, with 129 mm rainfall.

See also
List of rivers of Sumatra

Notes
1.Population calculated from the sum of populations in the 14 subdistricts of Medan municipality which were used for population calculation in the citation.

References

Rivers of North Sumatra
Rivers of Indonesia